Condea is a genus of flowering plants in the family Lamiaceae.

Species 
 Condea albida
 Condea americana
 Condea anitae
 Condea chyliantha
 Condea cubensis
 Condea decipiens
 Condea domingensis
 Condea elegans
 Condea emoryi
 Condea fastigiata
 Condea floribunda
 Condea iodantha
 Condea jacobi
 Condea laniflora
 Condea mixta
 Condea rivularis
 Condea scandens
 Condea scoparioides
 Condea subtilis
 Condea tafallae
 Condea tephrodes
 Condea thyrsiflora
 Condea tomentosa
 Condea trichopes
 Condea undulata
 Condea urbanii
 Condea verticillata

References

External links 
 
 
 Condea at Tropicos

Lamiaceae genera
Lamiaceae